Burundi is located in East Africa, to the east of the Democratic Republic of the Congo, at the coordinates .

Physical geography
As a landlocked country, Burundi possesses no coastline. It straddles the crest of the Congo-Nile Divide which separates the basins of the Congo and Nile rivers. The farthest headwaters of the Nile, the Ruvyironza River, has its source in Burundi.

Terrain

The terrain of Burundi is hilly and mountainous, dropping to a plateau in the east.  The southern and eastern plains have been categorised by the World Wide Fund for Nature as part of the Central Zambezian miombo woodlands ecoregion.

Natural hazards are posed in Burundi by flooding and landslides.

Natural resources
Burundi possesses reserves of: nickel, uranium, rare earth oxides, peat, cobalt, copper, platinum (not yet exploited), vanadium, niobium, tantalum, gold, tin, tungsten, kaolin, and limestone.  There is also arable land and the potential for hydropower.  Burundi has  of land that is irrigated.  The table below describes land use in Burundi.

Environment

Current issues
Soil erosion is an issue for Burundi, and is as a result of overgrazing and the expansion of agriculture into marginal lands.  Other issues include: deforestation, due to the uncontrolled cutting-down of trees for fuel; and habitat loss threatens wildlife populations.

International agreements
Burundi is a party to the following international agreements that relate to the environment: Biodiversity, Climate Change, Desertification, Endangered Species, Hazardous Wastes and Ozone Layer Protection.  The following have been signed but not yet ratified by Burundi: Law of the Sea and Nuclear Test Ban.

Extreme points 

This is a list of the extreme points of Burundi, the points that are farther north, south, east or west than any other location.

 Northernmost point – Muyinga Province; unnamed location on the border with Rwanda immediately south of the Rwandan town of Mbuye
 Easternmost point – Cankuzo Province; unnamed location on the border with Tanzania immediately northwest of Mburi hill
 Southernmost point – Makamba Province; unnamed location on the border with Tanzania immediately north of the Tanzanian town of Mwenene, 
 Westernmost point –  Cibitoke Province; unnamed location on the border the Democratic Republic of the Congo immediately east of the Congolese town of Kamanyola

References